Mian Kharreh-ye Bala (also Romanized as Mīān Kharreh-ye Bālā; also known as Meyān Kharreh, Mīān Kherreh, Mīān Khowreh, Miyan Khazeh, and Miyān Khurrah) is a village in Khvormuj Rural District, in the Central District of Dashti County, Bushehr Province, Iran. At the 2006 census, its population was 200, in 50 families.

References 

Populated places in Dashti County